Andrea Brunsendorf is a gardener, horticulturalist and landscaper.  She was born in Thuringia where she gained a degree in Ornamental Horticulture and worked for a breeder of flower seeds.  She has worked at a variety of international gardens including Kew Gardens where she gained a diploma in botanical horticulture; the ancient gardens of the Inner Temple, where she was its first female head gardener; and Longwood Gardens where she is now the director of outdoor landscapes.

References

Landscape or garden designers
Women horticulturists and gardeners
Year of birth missing (living people)
Living people